Aliabad-e Sadat (also Romanized as ‘Alīābād-e Sādāt; also known as ‘Alīābād, ‘Alīābād-e Pā’īn, and ‘Alīābād Pā’īn) is a village in Esmaili Rural District, Esmaili District, Anbarabad County, Kerman Province, Iran. At the 2006 census, its population was 500, in 97 families.

References 

Populated places in Anbarabad County